Grant Park is a neighbourhood in the River Heights area of southern Winnipeg, Manitoba. Its general boundaries are Grant Avenue to the north, Stafford Street to the east, the CNR Mainline to the south, and Cambridge Street to the west.

History 
The Grant Park neighbourhood was one of the last areas in the former City of Winnipeg to develop.

The land around what would become Grant Avenue—now one of Grant Park's most prominent streets—was first developed with the introduction of the Harte Subdivision for the Grand Trunk Pacific Railway (later Canadian National Railway) in 1908. When the ground of the railway track sank between Pembina Highway and Cambridge Street, the builders had to refix it with cement, rocks, and gravel. This track was later declared surplus and sold to the City. The tracks were removed, the ground was redone, the street expanded to include a service road and renamed Grant Avenue.

From the early 1900s to 1960, some of the area along the rail line in present-day Grant Avenue became home to a Métis shanty town known as Rooster Town. At its peak in the 1930s, Rooster Town reached from Winnipeg's Stafford Street to Lindsay Street. Following World War II, with the uniquely fast rate at which Winnipeg was suburbanizing, development on cheap land just north of Rooster Town lead to new homes beginning to infringe on Rooster Town territory. In 1949, the children of Rooster Town saw their first opportunity to receive an education, with the construction of Rockwood School in the northeast corner of the settlement.

In the late 1950s, residents of Rooster Town were pressured to relocate their homes in order to make way for the construction of a new shopping centre, today's Grant Park Shopping Centre. In 1959, the remaining residents were evicted and their homes were burnt or torn down. Chiefly because of the presence of Rockwood School and Grant Park High School (opened in 1959), the neighbourhood around the schools became more organized. Finally, by the early 1960s, Rooster Town was absorbed by a new middle-class suburb of ratepayers.

In the late 1960s, construction for the Grant Park Shopping Centre complex was complete; it originally featured a Woolco, Gambles, Safeway, and Dominion stores. The Pan Am Pool was also built during this time so that Winnipeg could host the 1967 Pan American Games. Until 2006, Pan Am was home to the Canadian Aquatic Hall of Fame. Also around the same time that the shopping centre and pool were being constructed, various mid-rise and high-rise apartment buildings were being built. Some of the apartment blocks have undergone major interior and exterior renovations.

Demographics 

As of the 2006 Census, the population of the Grant Park neighbourhood was 2,700 people, which grew to 2,725 by the 2016 Census. Nearly 40% of the population are a visible minority, and 8% of them are Aboriginal. Almost 21% of the people are not affiliated with any religions. The average household income in the area is CA$57,477.

Points of interest 

 Pan Am Pool
 Grant Park Shopping Centre
 Grant Park High School
 Manitoba Electrical Museum
 Manitoba Hydro, 820 Taylor Ave.
 CN Mainline
Between 1976 and the mid-1990s, Winnipeg Videon had their administration and head offices located in the area, at 651 & 657 Stafford Street.

See also 

 1999 Pan American Games

References 

Neighbourhoods in Winnipeg
River Heights, Winnipeg